Hildegarde Howard (April 3, 1901 – February 28, 1998) was an American pioneer in paleornithology, mentored by the famous ornithologist, Joseph Grinnell, at the Museum of Vertebrate Zoology (MVZ) and in avian paleontology. She was well known for her discoveries in the La Brea Tar Pits, among them the Rancho La Brea eagles. She also discovered and described Pleistocene flightless waterfowl at the prehistoric Ballona wetlands of coastal Los Angeles County at Playa del Rey. In 1953, Howard became the third woman to be awarded the Brewster Medal. She was also the first woman president of the Southern California Academy of Sciences. Hildegarde, throughout her career wrote 150 papers.

Biography 
Howard was born in Washington, D.C., and moved with her parents to Los Angeles in 1906; her father was a scriptwriter and her mother a musician and composer.  In 1920 Howard commenced her studies at the Southern Branch of the University of California (later renamed UCLA).  Her first biology teacher, Pirie Davidson, inspired her to change her concentration from journalism to biology; Davidson helped her get a job working for the paleontologist Chester Stock.  She completed her bachelor's degree at U.C. Berkeley, in 1924, where she took courses in paleontology.  That same year, Howard joined the scientific staff of the Los Angeles County Museum of Natural History part-time; her work there on the extinct turkey Parapavo californicus was credited towards her master's degree which was received in 1926 at Berkeley, where she would also earn the Ph.D. in 1928, with a dissertation on the fossil birds of the Emery Shellmound.

In 1929 Howard returned to the Los Angeles County Museum of Natural History and she held a permanent position there as a curator. However, she was not officially given the title of a curator until 1938. Her initial title was Junior clerk and Howard’s job was researching fossils from the Rancho La Brea as well as curating them. Named chief curator of science in 1951, she retired in 1961, but continued to conduct research and to publish on avian evolution. While at the museum and in retirement, Howard described 3 families, 13 genera, 57 species, and 2 subspecies. In 1977 the Los Angeles Museum of History decided to honour Hildegare Howard in the Cenozoic life Hall.

Howard married Henry Anson Wylde in 1930. Wylde, who would become chief of exhibits at the Los Angeles County Museum of Natural History, died in 1984. Hildegarde Howard passed away on 28 February 1998. She passed away right before her 97th birthday in California, at home.

Significant works 
Howard published some 150 scientific papers over the course of her career.

Some of Howard’s most transformative work was done at the La Brea Tar pits. The La Brea tar pits were filled with vast quantities of bird bones, which would provide extensive research potential for Howard throughout her life. Howard's first introduction to the field was sorting bones from La Brea at the Los Angeles County Museum of Natural History, where she would also meet her future husband Henry Anson Wylde.

New Avian Fossil 
In Howard’s New Avian Fossil research she found an extinct family of seabirds. Howard was allowed to research a coracoid bone (between the shoulder blade and sternum) discovered for a species of avian (bird) not yet known by the public record, she concluded through previous evidence and modern avians that the bird was a newly discovered species of a water bird, by the shape of the shoulder and chest bone.  She named this family of pelecaniformes seabirds protopteridae.

Review of Extinct Avian Genus 
Howard conducted an experiment in which she took wasps from their home ecosystem and brought them to a greenhouse to see how they would take to the conditions of isolation and whether or not they would nest in that environment. After corrections to the methodology of the experiment, she was able to collect 41 nests to study the structure of their nesting.

The Avifauna of Emeryville Shellmound 
Howard’s 1929 dissertation, “The Avifauna of Emeryville Shellmound” was particularly influential at the time. The dissertation she wrote thoroughly labelled ornithological fossil specimens, and paired the terms with visual representations. This allowed common terminology to be taught and widely popularized her work in the field. Her diagrams were eventually phased out after Nomina Anatomica Avium was published in 1997. The Avifauna of Emeryville shellmound was important because it set the grounds of vocabulary for avian paleontology. Howard detailed, named and labelled a baseline for the skeletal makeup of all birds. This work solidified her significance in the world of paleontology and continues to stay a point of agreement for paleontologists of all levels. The names used are still widely referenced and give a strong baseline when labelling unknown species.

A Census of the Pleistocene Birds 
Howard goes into detail, comparing two studies regarding the Pleistocene animals of the Rancho La Brea region. One of them is a census conducted by Dr. Chester Stock regarding mammals of the region while the other was a census of the birds. This entry seeks the common factors, if any, between the two groups.  She finds that there is a limitation on the age of the animals from the Rancho La Brea exhibit. This effect Is only manifested in the specimens that came from the early to the middle part of the late Pleistocene era.

 
 Howard described the first "toothed" bird from North America and assigned the name "Osteodontornis" to it.

Examination of Abnormal Wing of a Pintail Duck 
In this paper, Howard is faced with the possibility of regeneration. A man claims that a pintail duck who had its wing shot off was able to grow it back. When the specimen was submitted to the Los Angeles Museum it was immediately noticeable that there was some sort of new portion joined to the old portion. The entry details this evidence but she does not conclude that this was the regeneration of the bones since it has never been recorded before but does keep the possibility open because of how closely related reptiles and birds are, since reptiles have the ability to regenerate.

New Species of Owl 
At the Los Angeles Museum, a collection called Rancho La Brea contains the bones of the Horned Owl which she had noted to be abnormal. The size of the bones could have easily been mistaken for the bones of a variety of North American as well as South American owls. She finds that the fossils resemble closest to Strix even though it is larger than either species that could be found in North America of the genus. She goes into a full-depth investigation along with evidence filled with measurements and comparisons and finally comes to the conclusion that the bones found in the exhibit were of a new species, which is now named the Strix Brea. She published her findings in The Condor in 1932, naming the entry ‘A New Species of Owl from the Pleistocene of Rancho La Brea, California’.

Contribution to New Road-Runner Species 
Located in the Conkling Cavern in Dana Ana County, New Mexico, the remains of extinct mammals, including of birds were found and were initially hypothesized to be from the Geococcyx californianus. After comparing the new specimen with the bones of other Geococcyx californius from New Mexico, Arizona and Mexico, Howard observes that none of them are similar in size to the specimen. A year earlier, fossils were discovered two miles away in another cave, whose size was similar to the specimen and exemplified further the dissimilarity of the specimen with the great roadrunner. Hence, Hidegarde Howard proposes that this specimen be classified as a new species called the Geococcyx conklingi.

Awards 
 1953 Brewster Medal (third woman to be awarded the Brewster Medal)
 1962 Guggenheim Fellow, Earth Science
 Elected President, Southern California Academy of Sciences (first woman president)
 1977 - Honored by having Hildegarde Howard Cenozoic Hall, Southern California Academy of Sciences, named after her
 1963 - Honorary Member, Cooper Ornithological Society

References

Further research 
 Joy Harvey & Marilyn Ogilvie (2000), The Biographical Dictionary of Women in Science, Volume 1, pp. 621 et seq
 Campbell, Kenneth E. Jr., editor. 1980. "Papers in Avian Paleontology Honoring Hildegarde Howard", Contributions in Science: Natural History Museum of Los Angeles County, No. 330 (September 15, 1970), 296 p. (Includes biographical sketches and a bibliography of her works.)
 
 

 Archives
 Hildegarde Howard Papers, archives, George C. Page Museum, Hancock Park, California
 Hildegarde Howard Papers, archives, Natural History Museum of Los Angeles County, Los Angeles, California
 Chester Stock Papers, George C. Page Museum, Hancock Park, Museum

External links 

 Hildegarde Howard Society, Los Angeles County Natural History Museum
 Science of Motherhood (photo)

1901 births
1998 deaths
American ornithologists
Women ornithologists
American women biologists
American paleontologists
University of California, Los Angeles alumni
University of California, Berkeley alumni
Scientists from Los Angeles
20th-century American zoologists
Women paleontologists
20th-century American women scientists